Rajella fyllae is a species of skate in the family Rajidae.

Name

The scientific name fyllae refers to the ship HDMS Fylla, from where the holotype was collected by the Fylla scientific expeditions of 1884 and 1886 to Greenland.

It is sometimes called the round ray or round skate, but those names are also used for the family Urotrygonidae or the genera Heliotrygon and Irolita. The name Fylla's ray is also used, perhaps by writers who thought that "Fylla" was the name of a person.

Distribution

The round ray lives in the North Atlantic Ocean and Arctic Ocean.

Description 

Like all rays, the round ray has a flattened body with broad, wing-like pectoral fins. Its dorsal (upper) surface is grey or brown, with the lower surface light gray or fawn, with dark patches on the pelvic fins and axils of pectoral fins.

Behaviour

Rajella fyllae feeds on mysids, copepods, crustaceans and amphipods.

In breeding, there is a distinct pairing of the male and female, with an "embrace." It is oviparous, the eggs being oblong with stiff pointed "horns" in the corners; they are deposited in sandy or muddy flats.

See also

References

External links
 

round ray
Fish of the North Atlantic
Fish of the Arctic Ocean
Fish described in 1887
Taxa named by Christian Frederik Lütken